FC Vagharshapat, is a defunct Armenian football club from the town of Vagharshapat (Etchmiadzin), Armavir Province.

History 
The club was founded in 2003 as FC Vagharshapat, and participated in the Armenian First League. The team achieved 2nd place in the league during its first season, but was unable to achieve promotion to the premier league. The following two season the club finished in 4th and 8th place respectively. In year 2006 it was unable to find a sponsor and disbanded.

League record

References

External links 
 Vagarshapat at www.weltfussballarchiv.com 
 RSSSF Armenia (and subpages per year)

Defunct football clubs in Armenia
Association football clubs established in 1967
Association football clubs disestablished in 2005
1967 establishments in Armenia
2005 disestablishments in Armenia
Vagharshapat